State Route 83 (SR 83) is a short north–south highway in DeKalb County, Tennessee. The road begins near Bluhmtown and ends north of Smithville.

Route description
SR 83 begins at SR 146 in the small community of Bluhmtown. It proceeds north as New Home Road and intersects with U.S. Route 70 (US 70) and SR 26 on the west side of Smithville. After the intersection, SR 83 becomes Allen Ferry Road and goes east-northeastward to its northern terminus at SR 56 in northern Smithville.

Major intersections

See also

References

External links

Transportation in DeKalb County, Tennessee
083